The 1983–84 Alabama Crimson Tide men's basketball team represented the University of Alabama in the 1983–84 NCAA Division I men's basketball season. The team's head coach was Wimp Sanderson, who was in his fourth season at Alabama. The team played their home games at Coleman Coliseum in Tuscaloosa, Alabama. They finished the season 18–12, 10–8 in SEC play, finishing in fifth place.

The Tide had to deal with the loss of backcourt mates Ennis Whatley, who declared for the NBA draft after his sophomore season, and Mike Davis, who graduated.  To offset the loss, the Tide signed freshmen Terry Coner and Craig Dudley.

The Tide lost to Kentucky in the SEC tournament semifinals.  They received an at-large bid to the 1984 NCAA Division I men's basketball tournament, and lost in the first round to Illinois State.

Roster

References 

Alabama Crimson Tide men's basketball seasons
Alabama
Alabama
1983 in sports in Alabama
1984 in sports in Alabama